= The Last Firehawk =

Children's book series

The Last Firehawk is a children's book series by British author Katrina Charman. The series is set in the fantasy world of Perodia, where anthropomorphic animals are the main characters. The main characters are Blaze, a firehawk, Tag, an owl, and Skyla, a squirrel.

The original English-language series was published by Scholastic as part of its Branches line of early chapter books. The books are aimed primarily at young readers and feature short chapters and illustrations.

== Plot ==
The series follows Blaze, Tag and Skyla as they go on adventures throughout Perodia and face various magical threats.

The first six books form a connected story arc centered on the vulture Thorn, dark magic and the Ember Stone. The three friends must find the pieces of the Ember Stone and use its power to protect Perodia.

The first book, The Ember Stone, introduces Tag, a young owl who wants to become one of the Owls of Valor. After Tag and Skyla discover a mysterious golden egg, it hatches into Blaze, a firehawk thought to be extinct. The three friends then begin a quest to find the Ember Stone and stop Thorn and the Shadow.

The first story arc concludes with the sixth book, The Battle for Perodia. Beginning with the seventh book, The Cloud Kingdom, a new story arc begins. Blaze, Tag and Skyla set out to discover the whereabouts of Blaze's family and the other firehawks. The subsequent books take the characters to different regions of Perodia and introduce new characters and conflicts.

In the later books, the Shadow returns as a threat to Perodia.

== Books ==
Book	Title
1	The Ember Stone
2	The Crystal Caverns
3	The Whispering Oak
4	Lullaby Lake
5	The Shadowlands
6	The Battle for Perodia
7	The Cloud Kingdom
8	The Silver Swamp
9	The Golden Temple
10	The Secret Maze
11	The Underland
12	The Shadow Returns

The original English-language series currently consists of twelve books published by Scholastic.

== Reception ==
The series has received reviews from children's literature publications and independent book reviewers in both English- and German-language markets.

Kirkus Reviews described The Ember Stone, the first book in the series, as a promising beginning for young fantasy readers. The review highlighted the animal-fantasy setting, the adventure plot, the fast pace and the black-and-white illustrations, and classified the book as animal fantasy for readers aged six to nine.

Kirkus Reviews also reviewed The Crystal Caverns, the second book in the series. The review praised its fast pace, dialogue-heavy narrative and illustrations and described it as suitable for children moving from early readers to longer chapter books.

The German Borromäusverein published a detailed review of the German edition of The Ember Stone under the title Der letzte Feuerfalke und der Stein der Macht. The review praised the themes of friendship, courage and trust and noted the short chapters, age-appropriate suspense and illustrations. The reviewer recommended the book for children from the age of seven and also considered it suitable for reading aloud.

German children's literature blogs have also reviewed individual volumes of the series. Hörnchens Büchernest reviewed Der letzte Feuerfalke und die Kristallhöhlen, praising the continuation of the story and describing the adventure involving Tag, Skyla and Ruby as an exciting follow-up to the first book.

The German literature blog Sonjas Bücher-Blog reviewed the first volume in 2023 and highlighted its fantasy elements, adventure, friendship and illustrations, describing the story as particularly suitable for young readers and for reading aloud.

Additional German reviews have covered later volumes of the series, including Der letzte Feuerfalke und die flüsternde Eiche and Der letzte Feuerfalke und das geheime Labyrinth.

== German continuation ==
The German publisher Loewe Verlag is continuing the series with further books. According to Katrina Charman, Scholastic does not intend to publish further books in the series. Charman is therefore working with the German publisher Loewe to continue the series and write additional books.

Books 13, 14 and 15 are currently planned for publication only in Germany. Book 13, Der letzte Feuerfalke und das magische Ei, is scheduled for publication in Germany on 12 November 2026.

== Author ==
The series was written by British children's author Katrina Charman. Charman lives in England and has written several children's book series in addition to The Last Firehawk.
